Puyallup School District is a school district that supports the City of Puyallup, Washington, United States, and its surrounding areas. It was the third school district formed in the state of Washington.  It is the 8th largest school district in Washington. The district has 22 elementary schools, seven junior high schools, three senior high schools and an alternative school, which together serve over 22,250 students. The district employs more than 1,560 certificated, 1,450 classified staff, and 570 substitute personnel.

The current superintendent of the Puyallup School District is Dr. John Polm, who became the superintendent in July 2020 after the retirement of his predecessor, Dr. Tim Yeomans.

History
The first school in the district was Fort Maloney. It was originally used by soldiers as a storehouse, but later became known as the "Blockhouse" School, where one of its occupants from the John Carson family, Emma Carson, began teaching in 1861.

Soon, as more settlers came west, more small, makeshift schools were built for the children who fared poorly in winter months. After teaching and learning in these makeshift schools, it came to the people's attention that others were less inclined to settle in Puyallup because of the lack of proper schooling facilities. They built Central School in response to a vote in 1885. Because of the new school, in addition to other benefits the Puyallup area had to offer, more settlers began to come to Puyallup.

The school district has closed down two elementary schools so far, Hilltop and Riverside. Hilltop Elementary was acquired during the consolidation of Edgemont SD with Puyallup in 1967. It was closed due to decreasing enrollment numbers and unsustainability. The remaining Hilltop students were transferred to Mountain View and Northwood. Riverside Elementary was acquired during the consolidation of Riverside SD with Puyallup in 1962. It was closed due to its position on a floodplain, decreasing enrollment numbers, and unsustainability. The remaining Riverside students were transferred to Waller Road and Karshner. Both schools were closed together right before the 2007-2008 school year. Riverside was later leased to the Puget Sound Educational Service District for its ReLife program; of which the lease was considered successful interim. The Puyallup school board later declared the property to be a "surplus" and authorized the district to seek a buyer. The former school was sold to the Washington Premier Football Club in 2018.

In 2015, the district was sued for alleged negligence in a sexual abuse case by a student at Ridgecrest Elementary during the 2013 school year. The district settled the suit, paying $3.75 million to the plaintiffs.

In 2018, the beginning of school was delayed due to all teachers in the district striking for several days in response to neighboring districts receiving much higher raises than those in Puyallup. In preparation for the strike, the regular school board meeting prior to the start of school was packed with teachers looking for answers and good news from district leadership. After days of delayed school and teachers on the picket lines, the strike came to an end and school resumed when the Puyallup Education Association passed an average 11% raise, making the pay range for teachers $52,000-100,000 annually.

In 2019, several victims of abuse by a former Kalles Junior High teacher and coach stepped forward about what they experienced as students between 1991 and 2004. The abuser, Tim Paulsen, had a great relationship with school administrators and colleagues, making him unassuming to them as someone who could be a child predator. He had inappropriate relations with his students and athletes. The lawsuit resulted in a $7.5 million settlement to be paid by the district. Paulsen could not be criminally charged for the incidents because of the statute of limitations.

Geography

The school district includes the majority of Puyallup as well as most of Edgewood, North Puyallup, South Hill, and Waller. It also includes portions of Alderton, Fife, Graham, Summit, Summit View, and Sumner.

Demographics
The following is based on the 2017-2018 and 2018-2019 school years:

By diversity:

 13.2% of students were learning English.
 29.3% of students were on free or reduced lunch.

By race/ethnicity:

 56.3% White
 17.4% Hispanic/Latino
 12.7% two or more races
 5.8% Asian
 5% Black
 1.9% Native Hawaiian or other Pacific Islander
 1% American Indian or Alaska Native

By gender:

 48% female
 52% male

Schools
The Puyallup School District in addition to its four high schools, seven junior high schools, and 22 elementary schools has a unified Puyallup Digital Learning (PDL) school which facilitates the Puyallup Online Academy (POA) and Puyallup Parent Partnership (P4) programs.

High schools
Puyallup has four high schools:

High schools in Puyallup cover grades 10-12.

Junior high schools
Puyallup has seven junior high schools:

Junior high schools in Puyallup serve grades 7-9.

Elementary schools
Puyallup has 22 elementary schools:

Elementary schools in Puyallup serve grades K-6.

References

External links
 

School districts in Washington (state)
Puyallup, Washington
Education in Pierce County, Washington